Jamaal Abdul-Lateef (born Jackson Keith Wilkes; May 2, 1953), better known as Jamaal Wilkes, is an American former basketball player who was a small forward in the National Basketball Association (NBA). A three-time NBA All-Star, he won four NBA championships with the Golden State Warriors and Los Angeles Lakers. Nicknamed "Silk", he was inducted into the Naismith Memorial Basketball Hall of Fame.

Wilkes played college basketball for the UCLA Bruins. He was a two-time consensus first-team All-American and won two NCAA championships under coach John Wooden. He was selected in the first round of the 1974 NBA draft by Golden State. In his first season with the Warriors, he was named the NBA Rookie of the Year and helped the team win a league title. Wilkes won three more NBA championships with the Lakers. His jersey No. 52 was retired by both the Bruins and the Lakers.

Early life
Jackson Keith Wilkes was born in Berkeley, California, and grew up in Ventura. He was one of five children of L. Leander Wilkes, a Baptist minister, and Thelma (Benson) Wilkes. Because he did not like the nickname Jackie, he went by Keith.

Wilkes was the incoming student body president and an All-CIF basketball star at Ventura High School in 1969. However, his father became pastor of the Second Baptist Church in Santa Barbara, and the family moved there prior to his senior year. Starring for Santa Barbara High School with fellow future NBA player Don Ford, Wilkes was voted CIF Class 4A Player of the Year after leading the Dons to 26 consecutive wins and to the playoff semifinals during the 1969–70 season. Wilkes was an All-America Prep player at Santa Barbara High School.

Wilkes' number was retired by both Ventura and Santa Barbara High School.

College career
Wilkes was a two-time consensus first-team All-American at UCLA. He teamed with Bill Walton to bring UCLA the 1972 and 1973 NCAA titles, and a third-place finish in 1974. Wilkes was part of UCLA teams that won a record 88 consecutive games. In three years at UCLA, Wilkes averaged 15.0 ppg and 7.4 rpg and shot 51.4 percent from the field. He was a two-time first-team All-Pacific-8 selection (1973–1974), a member of the 1972 NCAA All-Tournament Team, and a three-time first-team Academic All-American (1972–1974). Prior to joining the varsity team, Wilkes (20.0 ppg), along with Greg Lee (17.9 ppg) and Walton (18.1, 68.6 percent), was a member of the 20–0 UCLA Frosh team. Wilkes graduated from UCLA in 1974 with a BA in Economics.

In March 2007, Wilkes was inducted into the Pac-10 Men's Basketball Hall of Honor. In an interview with the New York Post in 1985 and in several public speaking engagements, legendary coach John Wooden stated, when asked to describe his ideal player: "I would have the player be a good student, polite, courteous, a good team player, a good defensive player and rebounder, a good inside player and outside shooter. Why not just take Jamaal Wilkes and let it go at that."

NBA career

In 12 professional seasons with the Golden State Warriors, Los Angeles Lakers, and Los Angeles Clippers, Wilkes was a member of four NBA championship teams – one with Golden State in 1975, the season he was named the NBA Rookie of the Year – and three with the Showtime Lakers (1980, 1982, 1985), though an injury prevented him from playing in the 1985 NBA finals against the Boston Celtics, yet the Lakers won the series in six games over the Celtics, 4–2. One of the most memorable games of his career was the series-clinching Game 6 of the 1980 NBA Finals against the Philadelphia 76ers; Wilkes had 37 points and 10 rebounds, but was overshadowed by rookie teammate Magic Johnson, who started at center in place of an injured Kareem Abdul-Jabbar and finished with 42 points, 15 rebounds, and 7 assists. "Jamaal Wilkes had an unbelievable game", said Johnson in 2011. "Everybody talked about my 42 [points], but it was also his [37-point effort]."

In 1982, Wilkes signed a six-year $5.3 million contract with the Lakers.

Wilkes missed the first seven games of the 1984 Playoffs due to a gastrointestinal virus.  When he returned to action on May 8, he received a standing ovation from the Forum crowd. He lost his starting spot to James Worthy early in the 1984–85 season and missed the final 40 games of the season and the playoffs after having torn ligaments in his left knee. The Lakers waived Wilkes on August 28, 1985, after he rehabilitated his knee, and he was signed by the Clippers on September 27 for the league minimum salary. On December 24, 1985, Wilkes shocked the Clippers by announcing his retirement, noting his lack of contributions to the team.

For his career, Wilkes registered 14,664 points (17.7 ppg) and 5,117 rebounds (6.2 rpg), averaging 16.1 ppg in 113 postseason games. He played in the 1976, 1981, and 1983 All-Star Games and was named to the NBA All-Defensive Team twice. The Sporting News named Wilkes to its NBA All-Pro Second Team three years. On April 2, 2012, Wilkes was announced as a member of the Naismith Memorial Basketball Hall of Fame induction class of 2012. He formally entered the Hall on September 7. On December 28, 2012, the Lakers retired Wilkes' jersey, number 52, and on January 17, 2013, UCLA retired his collegiate jersey, also number 52.

Player profile
Wilkes played well without needing the ball in his hands. He was a threat shooting from outside, and was also able to drive inside. He had an unorthodox jump shot, which he developed as a child to be able to compete against bigger kids on the playground.

Later years
Wilkes was hired as vice president of basketball operations by the Los Angeles Stars for the inaugural season of the new American Basketball Association (ABA) in 2000. At Wilkes' request, Wooden also joined the Stars as a consultant.

Personal life
Along with being one of the co-authors behind the book and audio course, Success Under Fire: Lessons For Being Your Best In Crunch Time, Wilkes became a motivational speaker. Upon his retirement from the NBA, he worked in real estate and financial services for 22 years. In 2003, along with business partner Liza Wayne, he founded Jamaal Wilkes Financial Advisors, a firm specializing in wealth management.

Wilkes is a long-time resident of Playa Del Rey, where late Lakers owner Jerry Buss, former Lakers coach Phil Jackson, and other Lakers and Clippers players have resided. He has two sons and a daughter. His older son, Omar (born May 13, 1984), graduated from the University of California at Berkeley where he played as shooting guard (6'4") for the basketball team. His youngest, Jordan (born August 10, 1987), also graduated from Berkeley, where he played center (7'0"). Only daughter Sabreen graduated from UCLA in 2005 (also playing volleyball for the college) and went on to pursue a modeling and acting career.

Wilkes made his feature-film debut as Nathaniel "Cornbread" Hamilton in the 1975 basketball-themed drama, Cornbread, Earl and Me.

Wilkes converted to Islam and legally changed his name to Jamaal Abdul-Lateef in 1975, but he continued to use his birth surname only for purposes of public recognition.

NBA career statistics

Regular season 

|-
| style="text-align:left;background:#afe6ba;"|†
| style="text-align:left;"|Golden State
| 82 || – || 30.7 || .442 || – || .734 || 8.2 || 2.2 || 1.3 || 0.3 || 14.2
|-
| style="text-align:left;"| 
| style="text-align:left;"|Golden State
| 82 || – || 33.1 || .463 || – || .772 || 8.8 || 2.0 || 1.2 || 0.4 || 17.8
|-
| style="text-align:left;"| 
| style="text-align:left;"|Golden State
| 76 || – || 33.9 || .478 || – || .797 || 7.6 || 2.8 || 1.7 || 0.2 || 17.7
|-
| style="text-align:left;"| 
| style="text-align:left;"|L.A. Lakers
| 51 || – || 29.2 || .440 || – || .716 || 7.5 || 3.6 || 1.5 || 0.4 || 12.9
|-
| style="text-align:left;"| 
| style="text-align:left;"|L.A. Lakers
| 82 || – || 35.5 || .504 || – || .751 || 7.4 || 2.8 || 1.6 || 0.3 || 18.6
|-
| style="text-align:left;background:#afe6ba;"|†
| style="text-align:left;"|L.A. Lakers
| 82 || – || 37.9 || .535 || .176 || .808 || 6.4 || 3.0 || 1.6 || 0.3 || 20.0
|-
| style="text-align:left;"| 
| style="text-align:left;"|L.A. Lakers
| 81 || – || 37.4 || .526 || .077 || .758 || 5.4 || 2.9 || 1.5 || 0.4 || 22.6
|-
| style="text-align:left;background:#afe6ba;"|†
| style="text-align:left;"|L.A. Lakers
| 82 || 82 || 35.4 || .525 || .000 || .732 || 4.8 || 1.7 || 1.1 || 0.3 || 21.1
|-
| style="text-align:left;"| 
| style="text-align:left;"|L.A. Lakers
| 80 || 80 || 31.9 || .530 || .000 || .757 || 4.3 || 2.3 || 0.8 || 0.2 || 19.6
|-
| style="text-align:left;"| 
| style="text-align:left;"|L.A. Lakers
| 75 || 74 || 33.4 || .514 || .250 || .743 || 4.5 || 2.9 || 1.0 || 0.5 || 17.3
|-
| style="text-align:left;background:#afe6ba;"|†
| style="text-align:left;"|L.A. Lakers
| 42 || 8 || 18.1 || .488 || .000 || .773 || 2.2 || 1.0 || 0.5 || 0.1 || 8.3
|-
| style="text-align:left;"| 
| style="text-align:left;"|L.A. Clippers
| 13 || 1 || 15.0 || .400 || .333 || .815 || 2.2 || 1.2 || 0.5 || 0.2 || 5.8
|- class="sortbottom"
| style="text-align:center;" colspan="2"| Career
| 828 || 245 || 32.9 || .499 || .135 || .759 || 6.2 || 2.5 || 1.3 || 0.3 || 17.7
|- class="sortbottom"
| style="text-align:center;" colspan="2"| All-Star
| 3 || 0 || 18.0 || .481 || – || 1.000 || 4.7 || 2.3 || 1.3 || 0.0 || 11.0

Playoffs 

|-
| style="text-align:left;background:#afe6ba;"|1975†
|style="text-align:left;”|Golden State
|17||–||29.6||.446||–||.702||7.0||1.6||1.5||0.8||15.0
|-
|style="text-align:left;"|1976
|style="text-align:left;”|Golden State
|13||–||34.6||.430||–||.778||7.9||2.2||0.9||0.6||15.9
|-
|style="text-align:left;"|1977
|style="text-align:left;”|Golden State
|10||–||34.6||.429||–||.821||8.0||1.6||1.6||0.6||15.5
|-
|style="text-align:left;"|1978
|style="text-align:left;”|L.A. Lakers
|3||–||36.0||.469||–||.545||8.7||2.7||1.0||0.3||12.0
|-
|style="text-align:left;"|1979
|style="text-align:left;”|L.A. Lakers
|8||–||38.4||.477||–||.676||8.5||2.0||1.9||0.3||18.4
|-
| style="text-align:left;background:#afe6ba;"|1980†
|style="text-align:left;”|L.A. Lakers
|16||–||40.8||.476||.000||.815||8.0||3.0||1.5||0.3||20.3
|-
|style="text-align:left;"|1981
|style="text-align:left;”|L.A. Lakers
|3||–||37.7||.438||.000||.667||2.7||1.3||0.3||0.3||18.0
|-
| style="text-align:left;background:#afe6ba;"|1982†
|style="text-align:left;”|L.A. Lakers
|14||–||38.2||.502||.000||.776||5.0||2.6||1.1||0.2||20.0
|-
|style="text-align:left;"|1983
|style="text-align:left;”|L.A. Lakers
|15||–||39.3||.498||.000||.614||6.0||3.4||1.3||0.7||19.9
|-
|style="text-align:left;"|1984
|style="text-align:left;”|L.A. Lakers
|14||–||14.0||.400||.000||.636||1.9||0.6||0.3||0.1||4.5
|- class="sortbottom"
| style="text-align:center;" colspan="2"| Career
| 113 || – || 33.6 || .465 || .000 || .727 || 6.4 || 2.2 || 1.2 || 0.5 || 16.1

References

External links

Wilkes' official website

NBA.com bio

1953 births
Living people
African-American basketball players
African-American Muslims
All-American college men's basketball players
American men's basketball players
Basketball players from Berkeley, California
Converts to Islam
Golden State Warriors draft picks
Golden State Warriors players
Los Angeles Clippers players
Los Angeles Lakers players
Naismith Memorial Basketball Hall of Fame inductees
National Basketball Association All-Stars
National Basketball Association players with retired numbers
Parade High School All-Americans (boys' basketball)
People from Ventura, California
Small forwards
Sportspeople from Ventura County, California
UCLA Bruins men's basketball players
21st-century African-American people
20th-century African-American sportspeople